= Æðaklettar =

Island in Iceland

Coordinates: 65°24′00″N 22°14′00″W

Æðaklettar (Icelandic pronunciation: [ˈaiːðaˌkʰlɛhtar̥]; also known as Æðarkletta [ˈaiːðarˌkʰlɛhta]) is an island of Iceland.
